Registry of Cultural Property in Poland is a heritage register for Polish cultural property. It is maintained by the 16 voivodeship offices for cultural property protection  headed by a voivodeship cultural property conservator acting on behalf of the voivode as the first-tier registration organ. In addition, selected units of territorial self-government: gminas, cities with county rights and counties have used an option to appoint a communal, municipal, city or county cultural property conservator , with some tasks of the voivodeship conservator usually delegated to such an office under an agreement with the respective voivode. The cultural property data is processed at the national level by the National Institute of Cultural Heritage, the latter also operating the National List of Intangible Cultural Heritage on behalf of the minister responsible for national cultural heritage, while all the abovementioned institutions are overseen by the General Cultural Property Conservator, an office fulfilling the tasks of the second-tier registration organ, held by a secretary or an undersecretary of state at the ministry responsible for national cultural heritage and acting on behalf of the minister.

The Act on cultural property protection and care divides the cultural property into three categories: (A) movable cultural property, (B) immovable cultural property, and (C) archaeological cultural property.

It does not cover the movable items included in the national library collections, the national archival fonds or in an inventory of a listed museum.

Notes

References

External links
List of immovable cultural property items created for Polish Wikipedia for the Wikipedia:Wikipedia Loves Monuments competition
List of immovable cultural property items maintained by National Institute of Cultural Heritage (Polish:Narodowy Instytut Dziedzictwa, NID)
List of movable cultural property items maintained by NID
List of archaeological cultural property items maintained by NID

Objects of cultural heritage in Poland
Law of Poland